Semaeopus gracilata is a species of geometrid moth in the family Geometridae. It is found in North America.

The MONA or Hodges number for Semaeopus gracilata is 7142.

References

Further reading

External links

 

Cosymbiini
Articles created by Qbugbot
Moths described in 1912